Alister George McLellan (4 June 1919 – 1 July 2012) was a New Zealand mathematician and physicist.

Academic career
Born in Christchurch and brought up in Westport, McLellan attended Nelson College and then the University of Otago, from where he graduated with a BSc and an MSc in mathematics and science. He joined the Department of Scientific and Industrial Research doing war work and after the war went to Edinburgh to do a PhD under Max Born. His thesis was entitled The radial distribution function and its application to the properties of fluids.

McLellan returned to the University of Otago and the University of Canterbury where he rose in the ranks of university administration in parallel with his research, becoming head of department in 1955, foundation chair of the new University Grants Committee. He was made a Fellow of the Royal Society of New Zealand in 1961 and Nuffield Foundation Commonwealth Bursary. He served as president of the Canterbury Branch of the Royal Society of New Zealand. He retired in 1985.

Selected works 
The Classical Thermodynamics of Deformable Materials Cambridge University Press 1980, reissued 2011.

References

External links
 institutional homepage 

1919 births
2012 deaths
People from Christchurch
People from Westport, New Zealand
People educated at Nelson College
New Zealand physicists
People associated with Department of Scientific and Industrial Research (New Zealand)
Alumni of the University of Edinburgh
University of Otago alumni
Academic staff of the University of Otago
Fellows of the Royal Society of New Zealand
Academic staff of the University of Canterbury
20th-century New Zealand mathematicians
21st-century New Zealand mathematicians